Escape from the Dark (American title: The Littlest Horse Thieves) is a 1976 family drama film produced by Walt Disney Productions, directed by Charles Jarrott and starring Alastair Sim (in his final film role), Peter Barkworth and Maurice Colbourne.

The film was released in the United Kingdom on May 26, 1976. In the United States, it was released under the title The Littlest Horse Thieves on a double bill with The Many Adventures of Winnie the Pooh on March 11, 1977.

Plot
Set in 1909, a coal mine in Yorkshire, England has used pit ponies to haul coal for many years. When they are to be replaced by machinery that will speed up production and increase profits, three children – Dave (Andrew Harrison), Tommy (Benjie Bolgar) and Alice (Chloe Franks) – learn the ponies are to be slaughtered so they team up in a scheme to steal the horses and give them their freedom.

Cast

Locations
Filming took place in 1975 around North Yorkshire and West Yorkshire such as Arkengarthdale, Langthwaite, Ripley Castle and Oakworth railway station. Also at Thorpe Hesley pit in South Yorkshire.

Home media
The film was released on VHS as Escape from the Dark (UK) and The Littlest Horse Thieves (US) by Walt Disney Home Video in the 1980s.

In June 1999, Anchor Bay Entertainment released the film on DVD for the first time in widescreen (1.85:1) aspect ratio and full-frame presentation without bonus features; Anchor Bay re-released the film on DVD on January 21, 2003 but only in full-frame presentation.

On July 28, 2009, The Littlest Horse Thieves was released by Walt Disney Studios Home Entertainment as a Disney Movie Club exclusive DVD, available only to club members for mail or online ordering.

References

External links
 
 
 

1976 films
1977 films
1970s historical drama films
British children's drama films
British historical drama films
American children's drama films
1970s English-language films
Walt Disney Pictures films
Films directed by Charles Jarrott
Films produced by Ron W. Miller
Films scored by Ron Goodwin
Films set in the 1900s
Films set in 1909
Films set in Yorkshire
Films shot at Pinewood Studios
Films about horses
Films about mining
1970s children's drama films
American historical drama films
1976 drama films
1977 drama films
1970s American films
1970s British films